The 10th Infantry Division "Piave" was an infantry division of the Royal Italian Army during World War II. At the beginning of World War II Piave was classified as an auto-transportable division, meaning it had some motorized transport, but not enough to move the entire division at once. On 15 July 1941 the division reorganized to a fully motorized division and was renamed 10th Motorized Division "Piave". The division was named after the river Piave, where during World War I Italy and Austria fought three major battles. The division had its recruiting area in Veneto and its headquarters in Padua. Its two infantry regiments were based in Vicenza (57th) and Padua (58th), with the division's artillery regiment also based in Padua.

History 
The division's lineage begins with the Brigade "Abruzzi" established  on 16 April 1861 with the 57th and 58th infantry regiments.

World War I 
The brigade fought on the Italian front in World War I. On 31 December 1926 the brigade was disbanded and its two regiments were transferred to the other brigades: the 57th Infantry Regiment "Abruzzi" to the IX Infantry Brigade and the 58th Infantry Regiment "Abruzzi" to the X Infantry Brigade. The X Infantry Brigade, which also included the 56th Infantry Regiment "Marche" and the 71st Infantry Regiment "Puglie", was the infantry component of the 10th Territorial Division of Padua, which also included the 20th Artillery Regiment. On 1 January 1928 the X Infantry Brigade exchanged the 56th Infantry Regiment "Marche" for the 55th Infantry Regiment "Marche" of the XIII Infantry Brigade. In 1934 the division changed its name to 10th Infantry Division "Piave".

On 22 February 1939 the 55th Infantry Regiment "Marche" was transferred to the newly raised 32nd Infantry Division "Marche" and on 15 May 1939 the 71st Infantry Regiment "Puglie" was transferred to the newly raised 38th Infantry Division "Puglie". On the same date the 57th Infantry Regiment "Abruzzi" returned to the division, the X Infantry Brigade was dissolved and the two infantry regiments came under direct command of the division, and the 57th and 58th infantry regiments and 20th Artillery Regiment changed their names to "Piave".

World War II 
On 10 June 1940 the Piave division was mobilized for war, but did not participated in hostilities. In early February 1941, it moved to Sicily in the area of Casteltermini, Canicattì, Aragona and Mussomeli. At the time it was subordinated to the XII Army Corps. In February 1941 it received additional materiel to become a "motorized division". On 27 March 1941 the Piave was sent to the province of Udine on the Italian-Yugoslav border in preparation for the Invasion of Yugoslavia, which commenced in  April 1941. By 16 April 1941 the division has advanced to the Pivka area and once hostilities ended it moved to Liguria between Savona and Genoa, where it arrived in May 1941. Between 21 June and 15 July 1941 the division was fully motorized and changed its name on the latter date to 10th Motorized Division "Piave".

In spring 1942 the regimental depots of the Piave raised the infantry and artillery units of the 105th Infantry Division "Rovigo". On 12 November 1942 the Piave moved to the area between Saint-Tropez and Grimaud in Southern France as part of the Axis occupation of France.

Between 1–10 January 1943 the division returned to Italy, where it was assigned to the Corpo d'Armata Motocorazzato, whose duty was to guard the southern approaches to Rome from a possible allied invasion. The division stayed in Velletri-Sezze-Priverno until August 1943 when the Italian focus shifted to prevent a possible German invasion. The division therefore moved to the North of Rome to the area around Via Cassia and Via Tiburtina. After Armistice of Cassibile was announced on 8 September 1943 the Piave received orders to move to Palombara Sabina, but was ambushed on the way by German detachments at Ponte del Grillo, north of Monterotondo. The division counterattacked and forced the German forces to retreat to Monterotondo. After negotiations with the German command, the Piave was transferred to the control of the municipal council of Rome and performed police duties in the city until the Germans dissolved the division on 23 September 1943.

Organization 

  10th Infantry Division "Piave" /  10th Motorized Division "Piave", in Padua
 57th Infantry Regiment "Piave", in Vicenza
 Command Company
 3x Fusilier battalions
 Support Weapons Company (65/17 infantry support guns)
 Mortar Company (81mm Mod. 35 mortars)
 58th Infantry Regiment "Piave", in Padua
 Command Company
 3x Fusilier battalions
 Support Weapons Company (65/17 infantry support guns)
 Mortar Company (81mm Mod. 35 mortars)
 20th Artillery Regiment "Piave", in Padua
 Command Unit
 I Group (100/17 howitzers)
 II Group (100/17 howitzers; group added in preparation for the deployment to North Africa)
 III Group (75/27 field guns)
 IV Group (75/27 field guns)
 310th Anti-aircraft Battery (20/65 Mod. 35 anti-aircraft guns)
 Ammunition and Supply Unit
 X Mortar Battalion (81mm Mod. 35 mortars; became the X Heavy Weapons/Anti-tank Battalion in July 1941)
 Tank Squadron (L6/40 tanks)
 10th Anti-tank Company (47/32 anti-tank guns; entered the X Anti-tank Battalion in July 1941)
 10th Telegraph and Radio Operators Company (entered the CX Mixed Engineer Battalion in July 1941)
 42nd Engineer Company (entered the CX Mixed Engineer Battalion in July 1941)
 810th Transport Section (replaced by the 220th Transport Section for the deployment to North Africa)
 117th Medical Section
 816th Field Hospital
 817th Field Hospital
 1x Surgical Unit
 22nd Supply Section
 10th Truck Section
 127th Bakers Section
 31st Carabinieri Section
 32nd Carabinieri Section
 66th Field Post Office

During its reorganization as fully motorized division the Piave was augmented between 21 June and 15 July 1941 with the following units:
 X Heavy Weapons/Anti-tank Battalion
 CX Mixed Engineer Battalion
 IX Infantry Replacements Battalion (attached)
 X Infantry Replacements Battalion (attached)
 108th Bersaglieri Motorcyclists Company

In November 1941 the two infantry replacement battalions entered the newly activated 10th Infantry Replacements Grouping and the division received an anti-aircraft artillery group:
 LXXIX Anti-aircraft Artillery Group (attached from November 1941 to October 1942)

In October 1942 the division received two more units:
 XII Anti-aircraft Artillery Group
 236th Transport Section

In 1943 the division received two more units:
 DVII Self-propelled Anti-aircraft Artillery Group (90/53 anti-aircraft guns mounted on Breda 51 trucks
 DLX Self-propelled Artillery Group (75/18 M41 self-propelled guns)

Commanding officers 
The division's commanding officers were:

10th Infantry Division "Piave":
 Generale di Divisione Francesco Zingales (1938 - 31 October 1939)
 Generale di Divisione Ercole Roncaglia (1 November 1939 - 14 July 1942)

10th Motorized Division "Piave":
 Generale di Divisione Ercole Roncaglia (15 July 1942 - 8 October 1942)
 Generale di Brigata Guido Bologna (acting, 9 October 1942 - 27 October 1942)
 Generale di Brigata Ugo Tabellini (28 October 1942 - 23 September 1943)

Notes

References 

 

Infantry divisions of Italy in World War II
Infantry divisions of Italy
Military units and formations established in 1934
Military units and formations disestablished in 1943